Telenești is a city in Moldova, located 91 kilometres to the north of the capital city, Chișinău. Telenești is the administrative center of the eponymous district. Three villages are administered by the city: Mihălașa, Mihălașa Nouă and Izvoraș. As of 2004, it had a population of 6,855, 89 percent of whom were Moldovan.

Media
 Jurnal FM – 88.2 MHz

Notable people
 Angel Agache, Moldovan politician.
 Nicoleta Dara, singer
 Nachum Gutman (1898–1980), Teleneşti-born Israeli painter, sculptor, and author

Religion 
Before World War II, the town had an important Jewish population. The Cathedral of St. Elijah from Telenești is one of the newest representative architectural monument. Țurcan Vasile is the priest of the St. Elijah Cathedral. The construction of Cathedral started in 2006.

Further reading 
 Axentie Blanovschi: Telenești, Ed. Timpul Chișinău, 1986
 Teleneshty (p. 421) at Miriam Weiner's Routes to Roots Foundation

References

External links 

 

Cities and towns in Moldova
Orgeyevsky Uyezd
Orhei County (Romania)
Ținutul Nistru
Shtetls
Telenești District